Manu Garba (born 31 December 1965) is a Nigerian association football manager. He is the current head coach of the Nigeria national under-17 football team. In November 2013, he won the FIFA U-17 World Cup. In March 2015, he won the 2015 African U-20 Championship.

References 

Nigerian football managers
1965 births
Living people